Dominique Abel and Fiona Gordon are Belgian film and stage directors, writers and actors.

Career 
Dominique Abel and Fiona Gordon have worked as a writing and directing team through most of their professional careers. They made their directing debut in 2005 with L'iceberg, which was co-directed with Bruno Romy. Their follow-up, Rumba, was screened in the International Critics' Week during the 2008 Cannes Film Festival and released to critical acclaim, with critics praising the film's semi-silent style.

Abel and Gordon then directed The Fairy (2011), which marked their last collaboration with Bruno Romy. At the 2nd Magritte Awards, the film received five nominations, including Best Film and Best Director, and won two. Their next film, Lost in Paris (2016), earned Abel and Gordon their second nomination for the Magritte Award for Best Film. They mentioned in a video interview in June 2020 that they are currently working on a new film called 'The Shooting Star' set in Brussels.

Filmography

References

External links 
 
 

Belgian film directors
Belgian film actors
Belgian film actresses
Belgian theatre directors
Belgian stage actors
Belgian stage actresses
Belgian screenwriters
Belgian producers
1957 births
Living people